The Men's Volleyball Thailand League is the top-level professional men's volleyball league in Thailand.  Contested by eight clubs, it operates on a system of promotion and relegation with the Volleyball Pro Challenge League. Seasons run from October to March, with teams playing 14 games each. Most games are played on Saturdays and Sundays, with a few games played on weekdays.

It is organized by the Thailand Volleyball Association (TVA). The league champion qualifies for the Asian Club Championship.

The league is recognized by the TVA, the FIVB, and the AVC. The league maintains strong ties with international volleyball governing bodies, adhering to the rules and regulations set by the FIVB and the AVC. The Women's Volleyball Thailand League is an FIVB-accredited club league, and its teams and players are registered with the FIVB. It is sponsored by Charoen Pokphand and therefore officially known as the CP Men's Volleyball Thailand League. In the Thailand League, the games are played during Saturdays and Sundays.

Thailand League clubs

There are 8 clubs in the league, with three promoted teams from Pro Challenge replacing the two teams that were relegated from Thailand League following the 2018–19 season.

Members

Stadiums (2018–2019)
Primary venues used in the Thailand League:

Results summary

Champions

Awards

Prize money season 2020–2021
Leg 1
Champion: 900,000 Bath
Runner-up: 600,000 Bath
Third place: 450,000 Bath
Fourth place: 300,000 Bath
5th place: 275,000 Bath
6th place: 200,000 Bath
7th place: 130,000 Bath
8th place: 90,000 Bath
Leg 2
Champion: 900,000 Bath
Runner-up: 600,000 Bath
Third place: 450,000 Bath
Fourth place: 300,000 Bath
5th place: 275,000 Bath
6th place: 200,000 Bath
Final Series
Champion: 1,200,000 Bath
Runner-up: 800,000 Bath
Third place: 600,000 Bath
Fourth place: 400,000 Bath
Total of All
Champion: 3,000,000 Bath
Runner-up: 2,000,000 Bath
Third place: 1,500,000 Bath
Fourth place: 1,000,000 Bath
5th place: 550,000 Bath
6th place: 400,000 Bath
7th place: 130,000 Bath
8th place: 90,000 Bath

Most valuable player

Best Scorer

Best Opposite Spiker

Best Outside Spikers

Best Middle Blockers

Best Setter

Best Libero

Thailand League clubs in Asian Club Championship

 In the 2019 EST Cola representative of Air Force
 2020 edition is cancelled because of the Outbreak of COVID-19 pandemic in the world

See also
 Women's Volleyball Thailand League
 Volleyball Thai-Denmark Super League
 Men's Volleyball Pro Challenge

External links
 Official website 
 Statistic thailand league website 
 Volleyball thailand league